Fuzhou Airlines is an airline headquartered at Fuzhou Changle International Airport, Fuzhou, Fujian province, China. It is a subsidiary of Hainan Airlines.

History
The airline was formed as a joint venture subsidiary of HNA Group and Fuzhou Municipal Government. As part of its initial operation, Fuzhou Airlines' professional personnel (including pilots, MRO staff and cabin crew) were provided by its parent company Hainan Airlines.

On 17 October 2014, the carrier secured its Air Operators Certificate (AOC) from the Civil Aviation Administration of China (CAAC). This certificate was needed to allow the launch later that month. Operations started on 30 October 2014 with its maiden flight serving the Fuzhou–Beijing sector.

Ownership
, Fuzhou Airlines has a registered capital of CNY2 billion ($33 million). The major shareholder of the company is the HNA Group (CNY1.2 billion, 60% stake), with the balance split between the Fuzhou State-owned Investment Holdings Co. keeping 20% of the shares and Century Golden Resources Group and Ningbo Ruitong Network Technology Co. having 10% each.

Destinations
Prior to the launch of services, the airline stated it had been approved to initially fly to seven domestic destinations from Fuzhou: Chongqing, Kunming, Haikou, Hefei, Taiyuan, Tianjin and Xi'an. The carrier plans to expand in the future in order to serve over a dozen domestic routes.

Fleet

, Fuzhou Airlines fleet consists of the following aircraft:

The company took delivery of its first aircraft, a Boeing 737-800 sourced from Hainan Airlines that was repainted in a red and white livery, in early . Fuzhou Airlines started operations with a fleet of two of these aircraft using a seating layout able to accommodate 8 passengers in Business and 156 in Economy class. There are plans to expand the number of aircraft in the fleet to 40 by 2020.

See also
Air transport in China

References

External links

Airlines established in 2014
Airlines of China
Companies based in Fuzhou
Transport in Fuzhou
2014 establishments in China
HNA Group